Breiz Atao (also Breizh Atao) (in Breton Brittany For Ever cf. Breizh atav), was a Breton nationalist journal in the mid-twentieth century. It was written in French, and has always been considered as a French nationalist journal by the non-francized Bretons. The term is also used for the broader movement associated with the journal's political position.

Founded in 1918 in the aftermath of World War I, Breiz Atao would exist throughout the inter-war years. It was highly influenced by the Irish War of Independence, which began in 1916 and whose aftermath ran into the 1920s. Early on it adopted an official pan-Celtic policy, and a strong pan-Latin use of the French language. In its later years it became associated with a Nordicist blood and soil ideology with aspects in common with Nazism. It ceased  publication in 1940, but was revived for an individual issue that appeared in 1944.

History

Creation
The journal was first published in January 1919. Initially the editorial group focussed mostly on cultural aspects of Brittany, but very soon the journal evolved into the official forum of the Breton French-speaking autonomist movement. Its founders were Camille Le Mercier d'Erm, Job Loyant, Morvan Marchal and Job de Roincé. It was founded by the Groupe Régionaliste Breton, presided by Job Breiz, collaborating with Korentin Kerlann). They were soon joined by young French speaking intellectuals Yann Bricler, Olier Mordrel and François Debauvais, who soon took up important roles within the group.

Breiz Atao organised a congress (in French) in September 1927 in Rosporden at which the Breton Autonomist Party (Parti Autonomiste Breton, or PAB) was founded. At its first meeting Maurice Duhamel was charged with maintaining links with wider French speaking political movements in France, in particular the French left wing, and became chief-editor of Breiz Atao. He gave the PAB a leftist and federalistic stance.

However during the 11 April 1931 congress, the PAB fractured into different factions. The factionalism led to the abandonment of the journal Breiz Atao, which was briefly replaced by the journal "War Sao", run by the nationalist faction in Trégor, Goëlo and Cornouaille, who were preaching (in French) full Breton independence.

Drift towards fascism
On 27 December 1931, in Landerneau, the first congress of the new Parti National Breton took place. Breiz Atao reappeared as the mouthpiece of the militants led by Olier Mordrel and François Debauvais.

In March 1933, Breiz Atao published  a draft political programme, drawn up by Mordrel. In this program, Mordrel created a proposed constitution for an independent Breton state, to which the French state should concede some of its resources, including overseas colonies, art, libraries, industrial equipment etc. Its borders would be determined "by way of a plebiscite". He also suggested the exclusion of foreigners from citizenship, and of all persons of mixed race; people from a Nordic background would be given preference. The new state should ensure "control of youth's education, designed to make men physically and morally healthy".

In July 1940, at a Pontivy congress, Debeauvis and Mordrel decided on editing a new journal, L'Heure Bretonne (The Breton Hour). This journal succeeded Breiz Atao. However Célestin Lainé, head of Bezen Perrot, an SS-affiliated militia, printed a one-off special issue in 1944, containing the recently deceased Debeauvais's statement of support for Lainé's activities.

See also
Breton nationalism and World War II
History of far-right movements in France

Breton nationalism